Anne Coventry, Countess of Coventry may refer to:

 Anne Coventry, Countess of Coventry (1673–1763), British religious writer
 Anne Coventry, Countess of Coventry (1691–1788), litigant over her inheritance